Unsuk Chin (born July 14, 1961) is a South Korean composer of contemporary classical music, who is based in Berlin, Germany. Chin was self-taught piano from a young age and studied composition at Seoul National University as well as with György Ligeti at the Hochschule für Musik und Theater Hamburg. 

The recipient of numerous awards, she won the 2004 Grawemeyer Award for her Violin Concerto and the 2010 Music Composition Prize of the Prince Pierre Foundation for the ensemble piece Gougalōn. In 2019, writers of The Guardian ranked her Cello Concerto (2009) the 11th greatest work of art music since 2000, with Andrew Clements describing it as "perhaps the most original and entertainingly disconcerting of all of [her concertos], cast in four brilliant movements that never quite conform to type".

Biography
Unsuk Chin was born in Seoul, Korea. She studied composition with Sukhi Kang at Seoul National University and won several international prizes in her early 20s. In 1985, Chin won the Gaudeamus Foundation located in Amsterdam, with her piece Spektra for three celli, which was created for her graduation project. She also received an academic grant to study in Germany, and moved to Germany that same year. There she studied with György Ligeti at the Hochschule für Musik und Theater Hamburg from 1985 to 1988.

In 1988, Unsuk Chin worked as a freelance composer at the electronic music studio of the Technical University of Berlin, realizing seven works: her first electronic piece was Gradus ad Infinitum, which was composed in 1989. Her first large orchestral piece, Die Troerinnen (1986, rev.1990), for women's voices, was premiered by the Bergen Philharmonic Orchestra in 1990. In 1991, her breakthrough work Acrostic Wordplay was premiered by the Nieuw Ensemble. Since then, it has been performed in more than 20 countries in Europe, Asia and North America. Chin's collaboration with the Ensemble Intercontemporain, which has led to several commissions from them, started in 1994 with Fantaisie mecanique. Since 1995, Unsuk Chin has been published exclusively by Boosey & Hawkes. In 1999, Chin began an artistic collaboration with Kent Nagano, who has since premiered six of her works.

Chin's Violin Concerto was awarded the 2004 University of Louisville Grawemeyer Award for Music Composition. It was premiered in 2002 by Viviane Hagner. Since then, it has been programmed in 14 countries in Europe, Asia and North America, and performed, among others, by Christian Tetzlaff, the Berlin Philharmonic Orchestra and Simon Rattle in 2005. 

In 2007, she was awarded the Kyung-Ahm Prize.

Chin's works have been performed by the orchestras around the world, including the Berlin Philharmonic, the New York Philharmonic, the Chicago Symphony Orchestra, the London Philharmonic Orchestra, the Los Angeles Philharmonic, and many others. Her works have been conducted by Kent Nagano, Simon Rattle, Alan Gilbert, Gustavo Dudamel, Myung-Whun Chung, Esa-Pekka Salonen, Neeme Järvi, Peter Eötvös, David Robertson and George Benjamin. Chin's music has been highlighted at the 2014 Lucerne Festival, the Festival Musica in Strasbourg, the Suntory Summer Festival, the 2013 Stockholm Concert Hall's Tonsätterfestival and at Settembre Musica in Italy. In 2001/2002, she was appointed composer-in-residence at Deutschen Symphonie-Orchester Berlin.

Unsuk Chin was closely associated with the Seoul Philharmonic Orchestra from 2006 to 2017, at invitation from Myung-Whun Chung, as their composer-in-residence and director of their Ars Nova Series for contemporary music, which she founded herself and in which more than 200 Korean premieres of central works of classical modernism and contemporary music were being presented, as well as, later on, as the orchestra's artistic adviser. From 2011 to 2020, she oversaw the London-based Philharmonia Orchestra's Music of Today series at the invitation of its chief conductor Esa-Pekka Salonen.
Chin has been appointed Artistic Director of the Tongyeong International Music Festival from 2022 onwards.

Style
Unsuk Chin does not regard her music as belonging to any specific culture. Chin names Béla Bartók, Igor Stravinsky, Claude Debussy, Anton Webern, Iannis Xenakis, and György Ligeti, among others, as 20th-century composers of special importance for her. Chin regards her working experience with electronic music and her preoccupation with Balinese Gamelan as influential for her work. In her orchestral work Miroirs des temps, Chin has also used compositional concepts of Medieval composers, such as Machaut and Ciconia, by employing and evolving techniques such as musical palindromes and crab canons.

The texts of Chin's vocal music are often based on experimental poetry, and occasionally they are self-referential, employing techniques such as acrostics, anagrams and palindromes, all of which are also reflected in the compositional structure.

Consequently, Chin has set music to poems by writers such as Inger Christensen, Harry Mathews, Gerhard Rühm or Unica Zürn into music, and the title of Cantatrix Sopranica is derived from a nonsense treatise by Georges Perec. However, in Kalá, Chin has also composed works with less experimental texts by writers such as Gunnar Ekelöf, Paavo Haavikko, and Arthur Rimbaud, Troerinnen is based on a play by Euripides, and Le silence des Sirènes juxtaposes texts by Homer and James Joyce.

Playful aspects are dominant also in Chin's opera Alice in Wonderland, which is based on Lewis Carroll's classic. The opera's libretto was written by David Henry Hwang and the composer. The Munich production, which has been released on DVD by Unitel, was directed by Achim Freyer, and it was selected 'Premiere of the Year' by an international critics' poll, which was conducted in 2007 by the German opera magazine Opernwelt.

Some of Chin's works are influenced by extramusical associations and other art genres, such as her orchestral work Rocaná which alludes to Olafur Elíasson's installations, or her ensemble works Graffiti and cosmigimmicks, the latter of which is being influenced by the art of pantomime and by Samuel Beckett.

Selected works

Awards and prizes

Portrait CDs and DVDs
 Unsuk Chin: Akrostichon – Wortspiel and other works. Ensemble Intercontemporain. CD. Deutsche Grammophon, 2005
 Unsuk Chin: Alice in Wonderland. Bayerische Staatsoper, Kent Nagano. DVD. Unitel, 2008
 Unsuk Chin: Rocaná, Violin Concerto. Viviane Hagner, Kent Nagano, Montreal Symphony Orchestra. CD. Analekta, 2009.
 Unsuk Chin: Xi and other works. (reissue of Akrostichon-Wortspiel CD). Ensemble Intercontemporain. CD. Kairos, 2011. 
 Unsuk Chin: Three Concertos. Myung-Whun Chung, Alban Gerhardt, Sunwook Kim, Seoul Philharmonic Orchestra. CD. Deutsche Grammophon, 2014

Other selected recordings
 Spektra für drei Celli. In: Ladder of Escape 6. Taco Kooistra, Viola de Hoog, Eduard van Regteren Altena. CD. ATTACCA, 1992
 Allegro ma non troppo. In: Fifty Years Studio TU Berlin. EMF Media, DVD 054, 2008
 Cantatrix Sopranica. In: Sprechgesänge – Speech Songs. musikFabrik, Stefan Asbury. CD. Wergo, 2010.
 cosmigimmicks. In: "Dokumentation Wittener Tage für neue Kammermusik 2013". Celso Antunes, Nieuw Ensemble. CD. WDR, 2013
 Fantaisie mécanique. In: "Euclidian Abyss". Vimbayi Kaziboni, Internationale Ensemble Modern Akademie. CD. Ensemble Modern Records, 2013
 Gougalōn. In: "Contact! 2012–13 season". Alan Gilbert, New York Philharmonic Orchestra. Mp3-CD. New York Philharmonic Records, 2013
 Six Piano Etudes. Mei Yi Foo. In: Musical Toys. CD. Odradek Records, 2012
 Six Piano Etudes. Yejin Gil. In: "Fulgurances". CD. Solstice, 2013
 Advice from a Caterpiller, bass clarinet solo 2007 [8'] (from Alice in Wonderland). Fie Schouten, CD Ladder of Escape 11 ATT2014140 
 Six Piano Etudes. Clare Hammond. In: "Etude". CD. BIS, 2014
 ParaMetaString. Esmé Quartet. In: "TO BE LOVED". CD. Alpha, 2020

References

Sources
 Stefan Drees (ed.): Im Spiegel der Zeit. Die Komponistin Unsuk Chin. Schott (Mainz) 2011.

Further reading

External links
 Performance of Unsuk Chin's Piano Etude No.5 'Toccata' 
 Website of the composer 
 Paul Griffiths: An introduction to the music of Unsuk Chin
 http://www.laphil.com/philpedia/unsuk-chin
 Documentary: Unsuk Chin on Unsuk Chin
 Article in 'The Guardian'
 Hanno Ehrler: Ordnung, Chaos und Computer – Die Komponistin Unsuk Chin
 

1961 births
Living people
South Korean classical composers
South Korean expatriates in Germany
German classical composers
21st-century classical composers
20th-century classical composers
Deutsche Grammophon artists
Women classical composers
Gaudeamus Composition Competition prize-winners
Hochschule für Musik und Theater Hamburg alumni
Seoul National University alumni
20th-century German composers
21st-century German composers
Women opera composers
20th-century women composers
21st-century women composers
Recipients of the Ho-Am Prize in the Arts
Pupils of György Ligeti